Rod George is a former Australian professional squash player.

George was born in Perth, Australia during 1954. He was based in West Germany as a club professional and reached the world's top 25 in 1982.

References

Australian male squash players
Living people
Sportspeople from Perth, Western Australia
1954 births
Date of birth missing (living people)
20th-century Australian people
21st-century Australian people